All My Friends Hate Me is a 2021 British comedy horror film directed by Andrew Gaynord and written by Tom Palmer and Tom Stourton, who also stars in the film. It was released on 11 March 2022 in theatres with a digital release on March 25. It premiered at the 2021 Tribeca Film Festival.

Premise 
Pete (Stourton) has returned from volunteering in a refugee camp and is celebrating the weekend of his 31st birthday at a country estate owned by his friend George (McGuire). Pete's girlfriend Sonia (Clive) is expected the following day but his first evening is spent reconnecting with university friends, George and his wife Fig (Campbell), 'foppish cokehound' Archie (Dickson), and Pete's ex-girlfriend Claire (Clarke). However, as the night goes on, Pete's friends' behaviour becomes more and more unsettling and Pete becomes more paranoid and insecure, as he suspects Harry (Demri-Burns) of plotting to replace him in the group. His paranoia soon boils over into a full-on psychotic breakdown during which his suspicions are debunked one by one.

Cast

References

External links 

 
 

2021 comedy horror films
British comedy horror films
Films set in the United Kingdom
British black comedy films
2020s English-language films
2020s British films